John Giles Adams (December 2, 1792 – May 14, 1832) was a cavalry officer in the Illinois Militia during the Black Hawk War of 1832. He was born in Nashville, Tennessee and came to Illinois in 1828, eventually marrying and fathering eight children. Adams served as captain in a militia company of more than 50 mounted volunteers who were mustered into service on April 17, 1832 following the onset of the war. Adams' company saw action in the disastrous militia defeat at Stillman's Run on May 14. Adams and several members of his company were killed while making a stand upon a hillside near the main militia camp.

Early life
John Giles Adams was born in or near Nashville, Tennessee on December 2, 1792. He came to Illinois in 1828 via oxen team and built a log cabin near Atlanta, Illinois. He eventually married and had four sons and four daughters, who were left in their mother's care upon his death. Prior to the outbreak of the Black Hawk War, Adams made his residence in Pekin.

Militia service
John G. Adams was captain of a company that included 59 other "mounted volunteers" from Pekin. The company was mustered into service for the Black Hawk War on April 17, 1832. Adams' group was part of the 5th Regiment commanded by Colonel James Johnson, which was in turn under the auspices of the Brigade of Mounted Volunteers and Brigadier General Samuel Whiteside. Including Adams, the company suffered four killed in action during the Battle of Stillman's Run on May 14, 1832; two other members of the company deserted two days after Stillman's Run. The battle was the first engagement of the 1832 Black Hawk War, and resulted in an embarrassing defeat for the Illinois Militia under Major Isaiah Stillman. The rest of the Adams' company was released from service on May 17, 1832.

Death
Captain Adams left Dixon's Ferry for Old Man's Creek, in command of his company, early on May 13, 1832. He was under the command of Major David Bailey, who was accompanied by two other companies. In addition, they were with Major Isaiah Stillman's three company command. The total militia force leaving Dixon's Ferry was around 275.

During an important moment in the disorganized battle at Stillman's Run, while much of the rest of the force fled in terror, Adams compiled a rear-guard element and took a position on a slight hill south of the main militia camp. Frank Stevens described Adams' death in his 1903 book The Black Hawk War:

The Hon. John A. Atwood declared at a 1904 meeting of the Ogle County Old Settlers' Association that Adams' bravery was comparable to that of George Armstrong Custer at Little Big Horn. At least one writer, however, has asserted that Adams' death was at the hands of his own men as he tried to organize them for battle. Adams' wife died in 1871 and all eight of his children were dead by 1899.

Notes

1792 births
1832 deaths
American people of the Black Hawk War
People from Nashville, Tennessee
United States Army officers
People from Pekin, Illinois
People from Atlanta, Illinois
Military personnel from Illinois